Be-Imaan is a 1972 Hindi-language film directed by Sohanlal Kanwar. The film stars Manoj Kumar, Raakhee, Premnath, Pran, Prem Chopra and Tun Tun. The music is by Shankar Jaikishan. The film was remade in Tamil as En Magan with Sivaji Ganesan.

Cast
 Manoj Kumar as Mohan / Shyam
 Raakhee as Sapna
 Pran as Constable Ram Singh
 Prem Chopra as Deepak Das
 Nazima as Meena
 Premnath as D. I. G. Gopal Das
 Sulochana Latkar as Mrs. Gopal Das
 Raj Mehra as Seth Jamna Das
 Snehlata as Kamini
 Rajpal

Soundtrack
All lyrics were written by Verma Malik and music was composed by Shankar Jaikishan.

Awards
Filmfare Best Movie Award
Filmfare Best Actor Award for Manoj Kumar
Filmfare Best Director Award for Sohanlal Kanwar.
Filmfare Best Music Director Award for Shankar Jaikishan
Filmfare Best Male Playback Award for Mukesh
Filmfare Best Lyricist Award for Verma Malik
Filmfare Best Supporting Actor Award for Pran, who refused to accept on the grounds that the Filmfare award for Best Music should have gone to Pakeezah (1972) and not 'Shankar Jaikishan' for Be-Imaan (1972)''.

References

External links 
 , Retrieved 27 Dec 2015

1972 films
1970s Hindi-language films
1970s Urdu-language films
Films scored by Shankar–Jaikishan
Hindi films remade in other languages
Urdu films remade in other languages
Urdu-language Indian films